"No Tengo Dinero" is a song by the Italian Italo disco duo Righeira from their 1983 debut album Righeira. It was written by Michael Righeira, the duo's backing vocalist and producers Carmelo La Bionda and Michelangelo La Bionda. While not as successful as their earlier single, "Vamos a la playa", the song nonetheless achieved high popularity, hitting 12th place in Germany. Much like their previous single, the song is written in Spanish because it was considered an unusual combination with electronic pop music, and celebrating in spite of hardship (in this case poverty, as opposed to nuclear war).

Commercial performance 

In Italy, it reached the fifteenth position on the Musica e dischi chart.

Music video 

The music video for "No Tengo Dinero" was directed by Pierluigi de Mas, who had previously worked with Righeira in the videos for "Vamos a la playa" and "Luciano Serra Pilota" (1983).

Track listing and formats 

 Italian 7-inch single

A. "No Tengo Dinero" – 3:20
B. "Dinero Scratch" – 3:28

 German 7-inch single

A. "No Tengo Dinero" – 3:38
B. "Dinero Scratch" – 3:28

 German 12-inch maxi-single

A. "No Tengo Dinero" – 5:30
B. "Dinero Scratch" – 4:58

 US 12-inch single

A. "No Tengo Dinero" – 5:30
B. "Tanzen mit Righeira" – 5:31

Credits and personnel 

 Johnson Righeira – vocals
 Michael Righeira – songwriter, vocals
 Carmelo La Bionda – songwriter, producer
 Michelangelo La Bionda – songwriter, producer
 Hermann Weindorf – co-producer, arranger
 Berthold Weindorf – engineering, mixing
 Ben Fenner – engineering, mixing

Credits and personnel adopted from the Righeira album and 7-inch single liner notes.

Charts

Weekly charts

References

Sources

External links 

 

1983 songs
1983 singles
Animated music videos
Compagnia Generale del Disco singles
Righeira songs
Song recordings produced by La Bionda
Songs about poverty
Songs written by Johnson Righeira
Songs written by Michael Righeira
Spanish-language songs